Tsamma melon, or simply tsamma, may refer to:

 Citron melon
 Namib tsamma
 Watermelon
 Tsamma juice, a brand of fresh watermelon juice